A Lover's Leap, or (in plural) Lovers' Leap, is a toponym given to a number of locations of great height.

Lover's Leap or Lovers' Leap may also refer to:

Places

Lover's Leap (Tahoe, California), U.S., a granite cliff
Lovers Leap State Park, an area on the Housatonic River in Millford, Connecticut, U.S.
Lover's Leap Bridge, in the state park
Lover's Leap Lighthouse, Jamaica
See the main article for a list of other places so named.

Games
Lover's leap (backgammon)

Music
 "Lover's Leap" by Les Brown composed by Bob Higgins
"Lover's Leap" ("Supper's Ready"), the first part of the song "Supper's Ready" by Genesis